Pollok House, formerly the family seat of the Stirling-Maxwell family, is located at Pollok Country Park in Glasgow, Scotland (which also houses the Burrell Collection).

Overview
The house, built in 1752 and originally thought to be designed by William Adam (but who may only have been consulted on the design), was subsequently extended by Rowand Anderson in the early 20th century. It was given to the City of Glasgow in 1966 by Dame Anne Maxwell Macdonald, whose family had owned the estate for almost 700 years. It is now managed by the National Trust for Scotland and is open to the public. The house was modernised internally in 1899 by Alexander Hunter Crawford.

Displayed within Pollok House is a large, private collection of Spanish paintings, including works by El Greco, Francisco Goya, Alonso Sánchez Coello and Bartolomé Esteban Murillo. There are also paintings by Rubens and William Blake, as well as glass, silverware, porcelain and antique furniture.  The house features servants' quarters downstairs (accessible free of charge), which include two shops and a restaurant.

The house has an extensive garden, boasting a collection of over 1,000 species of rhododendrons. The gardens behind the main house contain the Pollok Park Beech (Fagus sylvatical), which is thought to be 250 years old. This tree has an unusual form, with a swollen trunk ( girth at grade and  girth at  height) and a gnarled mass of branches.

There is also a complex of offices, stables and a sawmill, part of which dates from the 18th century. The stone arch bridge leading to the house over the White Cart Water was constructed in 1757. The heraldic lions on the gate piers were carved by John Marshall to a design by Huw Lorimer in 1950.

Art collection

References

External links

 Glasgow Museums & Art Galleries
 National Trust for Scotland details
 Photographs of Pollok house In Glasgow
 Pollok House Arts Society

Houses completed in 1752
Category A listed buildings in Glasgow
National Trust for Scotland properties
Historic house museums in Glasgow
Gardens in Glasgow
Country houses in Glasgow
Clan Maxwell